FC Slavyansk Slavyansk-na-Kubani was a Russian football team from Slavyansk-na-Kubani. It played professionally from 1990 to 2004. The best result they achieved was 6th place in the Zone 1 of the Russian Second Division in 1992.

Team name history
 1990–1993 FC Kuban Barannikovsky (based in Barannikovsky, Krasnodar Krai)
 1994–1998 FC Kuban Slavyansk-na-Kubani
 1999–2004 FC Slavyansk Slavyansk-na-Kubani

External links
  Team history at KLISF

Association football clubs established in 1990
Association football clubs disestablished in 2005
Defunct football clubs in Russia
Sport in Krasnodar Krai
1990 establishments in Russia
2005 disestablishments in Russia